Freckleton is a village and civil parish on the Fylde coast in Lancashire, England, to the south of Kirkham and east of the seaside resort of Lytham St. Annes. In 2001 the parish had a population of 6,045, reducing to 6,019 at the 2011 Census. The village is near Warton, with its links to BAE Systems. Warton Aerodrome's  runway is partly within Freckleton's boundary. Freckleton has a parish council, and is part of Fylde Borough, and Fylde constituency.

History
The name of the village appears in the Domesday Book as "Frecheltun" and is said to derive from 'Farmstead of a man called Frecla', with Old English tun and Nordic personal name. It was one of 62 settlements to be found in the Hundred of "Agemvndrenesse" (Amounderness). Another suggested derivation is from the Anglo-Saxon word for "lusty" or "argumentative".

Freckleton supplied water to the Roman fort at Kirkham, and in the 19th century was a port for the ship building industry. Rope and sailcloth, for the early boatbuilding industry, was made in the village for many years. Balderstone Mill, erected in 1880, was the first organised factory system in the village, its weaving shed had 320 looms, and the cloth it produced sold on the Manchester Cotton Exchange. These mills closed in 1980.

There was a water-mill, situated on the Dow Brook, from at least as early as 1427, when it was in the possession of a William Hodelliston. It was sold for the sum of £350, in 1882, with the sole purpose of its decommission, to allow the marsh to be more effectively drained.

The Quaker burial ground at Quaker's Wood, also known as "Twill Furlong", in Lower Lane, between Freckleton and Kirkham, has a single gravestone.

Until the 1920s, Freckleton had a tollgate and travelers to Lytham and Preston had to pay a toll to use the turnpike road. The toll was collected at toll house bridge. The toll could be avoided by crossing the Dow brook and walking along the bridle way.

In World War II, American forces from the neighbouring Warton Aerodrome resided in the village. The  Freckleton Air Disaster occurred on 23 August 1944, when an aircraft attempting to land at Warton during stormy weather crashed onto Freckleton's Holy Trinity School. Sixty-one people lost their lives, including thirty-eight infants, their two teachers, and the three air crew. Other victims included several residents and both British and American military personnel in a snack bar across the road from the school. Annual commemorations still take place, attended by residents and US veterans. The aerodrome was subsequently purchased by English Electric, now BAE Systems, and many BAE employees live in the village.

The area around the village War Memorial, now protected by railings, was once the village green, where stood the smithy and toll house.

Landmarks
The village is the home of Holy Trinity Church of England parish church which was founded in 1837 and of Freckleton Methodist Church which was founded in 1810.

The family butcher Snape, on Kirkham Road, was established in 1864.

Freckleton Library was opened in 1980 by Sir Edward Gardner, MP for Fylde South. It replaced the mobile library which used the same site. Before the new library opened, the public library was situated on Lytham Road. Freckleton Library closed in September 2016 as part of Lancashire County Council budget cuts but was reopened on 9 January 2018.

Sport
Freckleton Football Club play at the Rawstorne Sports Centre, located at Bush Lane. The club currently compete in the west lancs league division 2.

Freckleton Cricket Club plays at Bush Lane; it was formed at the beginning of the 1900s. It won the Meyler Cup for the third time in 2013, following up wins in 2012 and 2002. The side currently competes in the Premier Division of the Moore & Smalley Palace Shield Competition and will be led in 2015 by Andrew Hogarth, who succeeds the charismatic James 'Jimmy' Fiddler.

Freckleton stages the Freckleton Half Marathon each year in June. The race has been staged since 1965 and is the oldest half marathon in the UK. The first race was won by Ron Hill who participated in the 1964 Olympics marathon. It attracts over 700 entrants.

Images

See also
Freckleton air disaster
Listed buildings in Freckleton

References

External links

Freckleton Community Web Site
Freckleton Brass Band
Freckleton Half Marathon

Villages in Lancashire
Geography of the Borough of Fylde
Populated coastal places in Lancashire
Civil parishes in Lancashire